The original county seat of Grant County, Maysville is an unincorporated community on North Fork Lunice Creek in Grant County, West Virginia, United States. The community lies at the eastern approach of Mays Gap in Knobly Mountain along West Virginia Route 42.

The community's name is derived from the local Mays or Mayse family.

References

Unincorporated communities in Grant County, West Virginia
Unincorporated communities in West Virginia
Former county seats in West Virginia